Donna Andrews is an American mystery fiction writer of two award-winning amateur sleuth series. Her first book, Murder with Peacocks (1999), introduced Meg Langslow, a blacksmith from Yorktown, Virginia. It won the St. Martin's Minotaur Best First Traditional Mystery contest,  the Agatha, Anthony, Barry, and Romantic Times Reviewers' Choice awards for best first novel,   and the Lefty award for funniest mystery of 1999. The first novel in the Turing Hopper series (You've Got Murder, 2002) debuted a highly unusual sleuth—an Artificial Intelligence (AI) personality who becomes sentient—and won the Agatha Award for best mystery that year.

Donna Andrews was born in Yorktown, Virginia (the setting of her Meg Langslow series), studied English and drama at the University of Virginia, and now lives and works in Reston, Virginia.

Bibliography

The Meg Langslow series
Murder with Peacocks (1999). 
Murder with Puffins (2000). 
Revenge of the Wrought Iron Flamingos (2001). 
Crouching Buzzard, Leaping Loon (2003). 
We'll Always Have Parrots (2004). 
Owls Well That Ends Well (2005). 
No Nest for the Wicket (2006). 
The Penguin Who Knew Too Much (2007). 
Cockatiels at Seven (2008). 
Six Geese A-Slaying (2009). 
Swan For The Money (2009). 
Stork Raving Mad  (2010). 
The Real Macaw (2011). 
Some Like It Hawk (2012). 
The Hen of the Baskervilles (2013). 
Duck the Halls (2013). 
The Good, the Bad, and the Emus (2014). 
The Nightingale Before Christmas (2014). 
Lord of the Wings (2015). 
 Die Like an Eagle (2016) 
 Gone Gull (2017) 
 How the Finch Stole Christmas! (2017) 
Toucan Keep a Secret (2018) 
Lark! The Herald Angels Sing (2018) 
Terns of Endearment (2019) 
Owl Be Home For Christmas (2019) 
The Falcon Always Wings Twice (2020) 
Gift of the Magpie (2020) 
Murder Most Fowl (2021) ISBN 9781250760166
The Twelve Jays of Christmas (2021) ISBN 9781250760180
Round Up the Usual Peacocks (2022) ISBN 9781250760203
Dashing Through the Snowbirds (2022) ISBN 9781250760227

 A Murder Hatched: Collects the first two Meg Langslow novels. Released in 2009 by Macmillan, under its Minotaur/Thomas Dunne Books imprint.
 The Two Deadly Doves: Collects two novels, Six Geese A-Slaying and Duck the Halls. Released in 2015 by Macmillan, under its Minotaur/Thomas Dunne Books imprint.

Meg Langslow short stories
 "A Christmas Rescue" in Two Deadly Doves (2015).
 "Night Shades" in Chesapeake Crimes (2004).
 "Birthday Dinner" in Death Dines In, Claudia Bishop and Dean James, editors (2004).

The Turing Hopper series
 You've Got Murder (2002). 
 Click Here for Murder (2003). 
 Access Denied (2004). 
 Delete All Suspects (2005).

Short stories
 "Cold Blue Steel and Sweet Fire" in The Beat of Black Wings: Crime Fiction Inspired by the Songs of Joni Mitchell, (April 2020)
 "The Last Caving Trip" in Storm Warning: Chesapeake Crimes 7, (April 2016)
 "A Christmas Trifle" in Homicidal Holidays: Chesapeake Crimes 6, (September 2014)
 "Mean Girls" in This Job Is Murder: Chesapeake Crimes 5, (May 2012)
 "Normal" in Ellery Queen's Mystery Magazine, May 2011
 "The Plan" in Chesapeake Crimes 4: They Had It Comin (2010)
 "Spellbound" in Unusual Suspects, Dana Stabenow, editor (2008)
 "The Haire of the Beast" in Wolfsbane and Mistletoe, edited by Charlaine Harris and Toni L.P. Kelner (2008)
 "A Rat's Tale" in Ellery Queen's Mystery Magazine, September–October 2007
 "Cold Spell" in Powers of Detection, Dana Stabenow, editor (2004)
 "An Unkindness of Ravens" in The Mysterious North, Dana Stabenow, editor (2002)

Awards
Donna Andrews has won many industry awards for her fiction. As of 2009 she has earned 3 Agatha Awards, 1 Anthony Award, 1 Barry Award, 2 Lefty Awards, 2 Toby Bromberg Awards and 1 Romantic Times
Reviewers' Choice Award. Andrews has also been nominated for 3 Dilys Awards.

'Murder with Peacocks' 1999 Agatha Award for Best First Novel
 2000 Anthony Award for Best First Novel
 2000 Barry Award for Best First Novel
 2000 Lefty Award
 2000 Finalist for Dilys Award
 1999 Romantic Times Reviewers' Choice Award for Best First Mystery

'Revenge of the Wrought Iron Flamingos' 2009 Lefty Award nomination

'You've Got Murder' 2002 Agatha Award for Best Novel
 2003 Finalist for Dilys Award

'Crouching Buzzard, Leaping Loon' 2003 Agatha Award nomination for Best Novel
 2003 Toby Bromberg Award for Most Humorous Mystery
 2004 Finalist for Dilys Award
 2004 Lefty Award nomination

'We'll Always Have Parrots' 2004 Agatha Award nomination for Best Novel
 2005 Lefty Award

'Owl's Well That Ends Well' 2005 Agatha Award nomination for Best Novel

'No Nest for the Wicket' 2007 Lefty Award nomination

'The Penguin Who Knew Too Much' 2007 Agatha Award nomination for Best Novel
 2008 Lefty Award nomination

"A Rat's Tale", Ellery Queen Mystery Magazine – Sept/Oct. 2007
 2007 Agatha Award for Best Short Story

'Six Geese A-Slaying' 2008 Agatha Award nomination for Best Novel
 2009 Lefty Award nomination

'Swan For the Money' 2009 Agatha Award nomination for Best Novel
 2009 Toby Bromberg Award for Most Humorous Mystery
 2010 Lefty Award nomination

'Stork Raving Mad'2010 Agatha Award nomination for Best Novel
2011 Lefty Award nomination

'The Real Macaw''
2011 Agatha Award nomination for Best Novel
2012 Lefty Award

Professional memberships
 Sisters in Crime (Chesapeake Chapter)
 Mystery Writers of America (Mid-Atlantic chapter)
 Private Investigators and Security Association

References

External links
 Donna Andrews' Official Website
 Mystery Authors Online – Donna Andrews
 WebbsBlog – Interview With Donna Andrews
 

Living people
20th-century American novelists
21st-century American novelists
American mystery writers
American women novelists
Anthony Award winners
Agatha Award winners
Barry Award winners
People from Reston, Virginia
People from Yorktown, Virginia
University of Virginia alumni
Novelists from Virginia
Women mystery writers
20th-century American women writers
21st-century American women writers
1952 births